Guy Laforgue (born 13 April 1958) is a French rugby league player who represented France, including in Rugby League World Cup matches. Laforgue captained France when they played two test matches against the Australia touring team during the 1986 Kangaroo tour of Great Britain and France. He is the twin brother of fellow rugby league player Francis Laforgue.

References

1958 births
Living people
France national rugby league team captains
France national rugby league team players
French rugby league players
Palau Broncos players
Rugby league second-rows
Sportspeople from Pyrénées-Orientales
XIII Catalan players